Bryophilopsis is a genus of moths of the family Nolidae. The genus was described by George Hampson in 1894.

Species
 Bryophilopsis albiangulata (Mell, 1943)
 Bryophilopsis anomoiota (Bethune-Baker, 1911)
 Bryophilopsis cometes Hampson, 1912
 Bryophilopsis curvifera Hampson, 1912
 Bryophilopsis griseata Hampson, 1894 (from India)
 Bryophilopsis griseoplaga Legrand, 1966
 Bryophilopsis hamula (Snellen, 1872)
 Bryophilopsis leucopolia (Turner, 1926) (from Australia)
 Bryophilopsis lunifera Hampson, 1912
 Bryophilopsis martinae Laporte, 1991
 Bryophilopsis nesta T. B. Fletcher, 1910 (from the Seychelles)
 Bryophilopsis orientalis Hampson, 1912
 Bryophilopsis pullula (Saalmüller, 1880) (from Madagascar)
 Bryophilopsis roederi (Standfuss, 1892) (Near East)
 Bryophilopsis simplex Berio, 1957
 Bryophilopsis tarachoides Mabille, 1900
 Bryophilopsis vadoni Viette, 1982 (from Madagascar)
 Bryophilopsis xephiris Viette, 1976 (from Madagascar)

References

Müller et al. (2010). "The Nolidae of Jordan: Distribution, Phenology and Ecology". Entomofauna. 31 (8): 69-84.

Chloephorinae